Jemma Brownlow  (born 14 November 1979) was an Australian female water polo player. She was a member of the Australia women's national water polo team, playing as a goalkeeper.

She was a part of the  team at the 2004 Summer Olympics. On club level she played for Balmain Tigers in Australia. She graduated from Macquarie University.

See also
 Australia women's Olympic water polo team records and statistics
 List of women's Olympic water polo tournament goalkeepers

References

External links
 

1979 births
Living people
Water polo players from Sydney
Australian female water polo players
Water polo goalkeepers
Water polo players at the 2004 Summer Olympics
Olympic water polo players of Australia
Sportswomen from New South Wales
20th-century Australian women
21st-century Australian women